The 2016 Summer Paralympics are running from Wednesday 7 September to Sunday 18 September, in Rio de Janeiro, Brazil. This is a chronological summary of the major events that took place during the course of the Games.

Calendar

Medal table

Day 0 — Thursday 5 May

 Opening ceremony
The opening ceremony of the 2016 Summer Paralympics took place on the evening of 7 September 2016 at the Maracanã Stadium, Rio de Janeiro, starting at 18:30 BRT (21:30 UTC).

Day 1 — Thursday 8 September

Medals for day 1

Day 2 — Friday 9 September

Medals for day 2

Day 3 — Saturday 10 September

Medals for day 3

Day 4 — Sunday 11 September

Medals for day 4

Day 5 — Monday 12 September

Medals for day 5

Day 6 — Tuesday 13 September

Medals for day 6

Day 7 — Wednesday 14 September

Medals for day 7

Day 8 - Thursday 15 September

Medals for day 8

Day 9 - Friday 16 September

Medals for day 9

Day 10 - Saturday 17 September

Medals for day 10

Day 11 - Sunday 18 September

Medals for day 11

See also
 Chronological summary of the 2016 Summer Olympics

References

2016 Summer Paralympics
2016